Pultenaea paleacea, commonly known as chaffy bush-pea, is a species of flowering plant in the family Fabaceae and is endemic to eastern Australia. It is a prostrate to spreading shrub with linear to lance-shaped leaves with the narrower end towards the base, and yellow to orange and red to purple flowers.

Description
Pultenaea paleacea is a prostrate to spreading shrub with stems that have soft hairs pressed against the surface. The edges of the leaves are mostly rolled under and the lower surface is paler than the upper surface. The standard petal and wings are yellow to orange with red markings and the keel is red to purple. The fruit is a hairy pod.

Taxonomy
Pultenaea paleacea was first formally described in 1799 by Carl Ludwig Willdenow in the fourth edition of Species Plantarum. The specific epithet (paleacea) means "chaff-like".

Distribution and habitat
This pultenaea grows in heath, woodland, forest and swamps in near-coastal areas from south-east Queensland to Ulladulla in New South Wales.

References

Fabales of Australia
Flora of New South Wales
Flora of Queensland
paleacea
Plants described in 1799
Taxa named by Carl Ludwig Willdenow